Who's Your Daddy? is a 2002 American comedy film directed and directed by Andy Fickman.

Synopsis
Chris Hughes (Brandon Davis), an adopted and geeky Ohio high school senior, discovers that his recently deceased birth parents are the proprietors of a vast pornography empire and he is the inherited heir. Dropped into a bitter power struggle, his new flock of beautiful co-workers come to his aid. Chris Hughes is an outsider and geek in Ohio. He is in the middle of his senior year at high school and he is 18 years old. Chris earns extra money working on a paper route riding a moped. Right now, he would do anything to get out of the job. Chris is raised by his religious parents, Carl Hughes (Dave Thomas) and Beverly Hughes (Colleen Camp). They own a grocery store and are very strict on no drinking, smoking. sex until marriage. They also don't tolerate porn or porn magazines that Chris hides under his bed. His little adopted brother Danny Hughes (Justin Berfield) is popular and has a better chance with a girl than Chris. Danny usually gets away with murder from his parents; Chris always ends up getting in trouble. Chris is a reporter in the school newspaper, and he is a good writer. However, he is always late on deadlines or dedication. He has a crush on the most popular girl Brittany Van Horn (Marnette Patterson), who is the mean girl of their school. She dreams about getting out of town and becoming a famous actress or model. She has an entourage, too, and she is dating Hudson Reed (Ryan Bittle) on and off. Hudson is the popular jock—handsome and able to get any girl he wants. Chris always wished he could be like him sometimes. Chris even fantasizes a lot of times, wishing he could hook up with Brittany. It is never going to happen, as she does not know Chris even exists. Brittany only dates good-looking popular guys. Chris and his friends, who are nerdy perverts like Adam Torey (Charlie Talbert), Scooter (Martin Starr), Murphy (Robert Ri'chard) and Steven Chambers, are labeled as the outsiders and geeks of their high school. For once, they want to do something noticeable to earn a ticket to popularity. Chris had an idea to throw a party at his house while his parents are out of town. They need the booze to attract the popular crowd, especially Brittany and her entourage.

Production and release
The film's producers intended for Who's Your Daddy? to capitalize on the start of the 21st century's teenage sex comedy revival, as spearheaded by 1999's American Pie.

Fickman shot the film in 2001, but after an unsuccessful test-screening process in 2002, the film was shelved for a number of years. Unreleased theatrically in North America, Who's Your Daddy? finally reached US audiences on DVD in January 2005, followed by a short run in Icelandic cinemas the following summer.

References

External links
 

2002 films
2002 comedy films
2002 directorial debut films
2000s English-language films
2000s teen sex comedy films
American sex comedy films
American teen comedy films
Films directed by Andy Fickman
Films scored by Nathan Wang
2000s American films